Brachiacantha is a genus of lady beetles in the family Coccinellidae. There are at least 25 described species in Brachiacantha.

Species
 Brachiacantha albifrons (Say, 1824) (white-fronted lady beetle)
 Brachiacantha arizonica Schaeffer, 1908 (Arizona lady beetle)
Brachiacantha aurantiapleura Nestor-Arriola, Solís and Toledo-Hernández, 2021
 Brachiacantha barberi Gordon, 1985 (Barber's lady beetle)
 Brachiacantha blaisdelli Nunenmacher, 1909
 Brachiacantha bollii Crotch, 1873 (Boll's lady beetle)
 Brachiacantha decempustulata (Melsheimer, 1847) (ten-spotted spurleg)
 Brachiacantha decora Casey, 1899 (decorated lady beetle)
 Brachiacantha dentata Nestor-Arriola, Toledo-Hernández and Solís, 2021
Brachiacantha dentipes (Fabricius, 1801)
 Brachiacantha felina (Fabricius, 1775)
 Brachiacantha floridensis Blatchley, 1916
Brachiacantha gorhami (Weise, 1904)
Brachiacantha guatemalensis (Gorham, 1894)
Brachiacantha hexaspina González, Větrovec and Nestor-Arriola, 2021
 Brachiacantha illustris Casey, 1899
 Brachiacantha indubitabilis Crotch, 1873
Brachiacantha invertita Nestor-Arriola, Toledo-Hernández and Solís, 2021
Brachiacantha isthmena Nestor-Arriola, Toledo-Hernández and Solís, 2021
 Brachiacantha lepida Mulsant, 1850
Brachiacantha mimica Nestor-Arriola and Toledo-Hernández, 2021
Brachiacantha nubes Nestor-Arriola, Toledo-Hernández and Solís, 2021
Brachiacantha papiliona Nestor-Arriola, Toledo-Hernández and Solís, 2021
 Brachiacantha quadrillum LeConte, 1858
 Brachiacantha quadripunctata Melsheimer, 1847
 Brachiacantha querceti Schwarz, 1878 (oak lady beetle)
 Brachiacantha rotunda (Fabricius, 1775)
 Brachiacantha schwarzi Gordon, 1985
 Brachiacantha soltaui Gordon, 1985
 Brachiacantha stephani Gordon, 1985 (Stephan's lady beetle)
 Brachiacantha subfasciata Mulsant, 1850
 Brachiacantha tau LeConte, 1859 (t-marked lady beetle)
 Brachiacantha testudo Casey, 1899 (turtle lady)
Brachiacantha tica Nestor-Arriola, Toledo-Hernández and Solís, 2021
 Brachiacantha ursina (Fabricius, 1787) (ursine spurleg lady beetle)
 Brachiacantha uteella Casey, 1908

References

 "The Coccinellidae (Coleoptera) of America North of Mexico", Robert D. Gordon. 1985. Journal of the New York Entomological Society, Vol. 93, No. 1.
 Belicek, Joseph (1976). "Coccinellidae of western Canada and Alaska with analyses of the transmontane zoogeographic relationships between the fauna of British Columbia and Alberta (Insecta: Coleoptera: Coccinellidae)". Quaestiones Entomologicae, vol. 12, no. 4, 283–409.
 Canepari, Claudio (1990). "Who is the author of several genera of Coccinellidae: CHEVROLAT or DEJEAN?". Coccinella, vol. 2, no. 1, 38–39.
 Duverger, Christian (2001). "Contribution à la connaissance des Hyperaspidinae (2ème note)". Bulletin de la Société linnéenne de Bordeaux, vol. 29, no. 4, 221–228.
 Gordon, Robert D. (1985). "The Coccinellidae (Coleoptera) of America North of Mexico". Journal of the New York Entomological Society, vol. 93, no. 1, 1–912.
 Montgomery, H. Wilson Jr., and Michael A. Goodrich (2002). "The Brachiacantha (Coleoptera: Coccinellidae) of Illinois". Transactions of the Illinois State Academy of Science, vol. 95, no. 2, 111–130.
 Vandenberg, Natalia J. / Arnett, Ross H. Jr., M. C. Thomas, P. E. Skelley, and J. H. Frank, eds. (2002). "Family 93; Coccinellidae Latreille 1807". American Beetles, vol. 2; Polyphaga: Scarabaeoidea through Curculionoidea, 371–389.

Further reading

 NCBI Taxonomy Browser, Brachiacantha
 Arnett, R. H. Jr., M. C. Thomas, P. E. Skelley and J. H. Frank. (eds.). (21 June 2002). American Beetles, Volume II: Polyphaga: Scarabaeoidea through Curculionoidea. CRC Press LLC, Boca Raton, Florida .
 Arnett, Ross H. (2000). American Insects: A Handbook of the Insects of America North of Mexico. CRC Press.
 Richard E. White. (1983). Peterson Field Guides: Beetles. Houghton Mifflin Company.

Coccinellidae
Coccinellidae genera